Labcabincalifornia is the second album by The Pharcyde, released in 1995, three years after their debut Bizarre Ride II the Pharcyde. The album's production was handled by The Pharcyde themselves and Jay Dee, with additional help from Diamond D and M-Walk.
The video for the album's first single, "Drop", was directed by Spike Jonze and used footage  of the group performing the song backwards, replayed backwards, giving it a surreal quality. The song was a hit, as was the follow-up single "Runnin'," which peaked at #55 on the Billboard Hot 100.

Overall, this album is a more mellow and introspective affair than their debut and features more somber themes such as dealing with fame and success, drug abuse, and broken down relationships.
Album sales compared to Bizarre Ride did not fare as well; the group was not able to reach Gold status.
Although it received mixed reviews upon release due to the group's sudden shift of direction from its previous album, it received critical acclaim in retrospective reviews, with many lauding its consistency, smooth production and touchy subject matter. After Labcabincalifornia was released, Fatlip left the group to concentrate on his solo career.

Track listing
Information is based on the album’s liner notes

Notes
  indicates a co-producer.

Sample credits
Unless otherwise indicated, information is based on the album’s liner notes
Bullshit
"Sing Me Softly of the Blues" as performed by The Gary Burton Quartet
"Get Up, Stand Up" as performed by Bob Marley & The Wailers
"What's Going On" by Les McCann
Pharcyde
"Spinning Wheel" by Lonnie Smith 
Groupie Therapy
"Ladies First" as performed by Queen Latifah and Monie Love
"Inside Out" by Queen Latifah
"The Bilbao Song" by Cat Tjader
"Get Off...Come Here" by Ice Cube
"Lyrics to Go" by A Tribe Called Quest
Runnin'
"Saudade Vem Correndo" as performed by Stan Getz & Luiz Bonfá from the album Jazz Samba Encore!
"Rock Box" as performed by Run-DMC
"You Follow Me" by James Moody
"Flying Easy" by Woody Herman
She Said
"Down by the River" as performed by Buddy Miles
"Baby That's What I Need (Walk Tall)" as performed by Cannonball Adderley 
Passin' Me By by The Pharcyde
Splattitorium
"Fly Me to the Moon" by Vince Guaraldi Trio
Drop
"Django" by Dorothy Ashby
"The New Style" by The Beastie Boys (Vocal)
Hey You
"In the Evening" as performed by Yusef Lateef
"Hey You! Get Off My Mountain" by The Dramatics
"Vitamin C" by Can
Y?
"Why Is That?" by Boogie Down Productions
Moment in Time
"Keep My Heart Together" by Mass Production
"You Can Fly" by Sons of Champlin 
The Hustle
"You Send Me" as performed by Roy Ayers & Carla Vaughn
"(I’m a) Fool for You" by Freddy Robinson
Devil Music
"Eric B. Is President" as performed by Eric B. & Rakim 
"Da Mystery of Chessboxin’" as written and performed by Wu-Tang Clan
The E.N.D.
"Sunny" as performed by Earl Grant
Emerald Butterfly
"Anybody Needs a Big Man" by Cannonball Adderley Quintet

Additional personnel
Paul Arnold - Mix Engineer (2-4, 6, 8-12, 15-17)
Big Boy - Additional Lead Vocals (14)
Rick Clifford - Recording Engineer
Bryan Davis - Mix Engineer (7), Recording Engineer
Bob Durham - Keyboards (5)
Jay Dee - Drums (8)
Tim Latham - Mix Engineer (1, 13), Recording Engineer
M-Walk - DJ Scratches
James Mansfield - Mix Engineer (14), Recording Engineer
Tim Nimitz - Mix Engineer (5)
Randy Mack - Additional Lead Vocals (14)
Farnando Pullum - Trumpet (17)
Justin Reinhardt - Fender Rhodes (17), Organ played by (8)
Schmooche Cat - Additional Lead Vocals (14)
Madeline Smith - Sample Clearance Agent
Mark Spier - Sample Clearance Agent
Anthony “Biede” Walker - Recording Engineer
Gary Wallis - Recording Engineer

Charts

Singles

References

1995 albums
The Pharcyde albums
Albums produced by J Dilla
Delicious Vinyl albums